Bob Leonard may refer to:
 Bob Leonard (wrestling), (1941–2016), Canadian professional wrestling promoter
 Bobby Leonard (1932–2021), American basketball player and coach

See also
Bobo Leonard, American baseball player
Robert Leonard (disambiguation)